To Know You Is to Love You is an electric blues album by B. B. King, released in 1973. Produced by Dave Crawford in Philadelphia, it includes the participation of Stevie Wonder, the Memphis Horns, and members of MFSB, the house band for Philadelphia International Records in the early and mid-1970s.

Track listing
"I Like To Live the Love" (Dave Crawford, Charles Mann) — 3:29
"Respect Yourself" (Luther Ingram, Mack Rice) — 5:13
"Who Are You" (Dave Crawford, Horace Johnson) — 3:55
"Love" (B.B. King) — 3:10
"I Can't Leave" (Dave Crawford) — 4:13
"To Know You Is to Love You" (Stevie Wonder, Syreeta Wright) — 8:42
"Oh To Me" (Dave Crawford) — 4:27
"Thank You for Loving the Blues" (B.B. King) — 6:47

Personnel
B.B. King – vocals, guitar
Dave Crawford, Stevie Wonder, Charles Mann, Ron Kersey – keyboards
Earl Young – drums
Ronnie Baker – bass guitar
Norman Harris, Roland Chambers, Bobby Eli – guitar
Wayne Jackson – trumpet
Andrew Love – tenor saxophone
Larry Washington – congas
Vincent Montana Jr. – vibraphone on "Thank You for Loving the Blues"
Dave Crawford - arranger, conductor

Technical
Joe Tarsia – engineer

References

B.B. King albums
1973 albums
ABC Records albums
Albums recorded at Sigma Sound Studios